Erna Schorlemmer Loebell (30 June 1875 - 1945) was a German composer who published ballet music, marches, music for piano, and songs under the name Erna Schorlemmer and the pseudonym Erny Chaloix.

Schorlemmer was born in Dessau to Mathilde Hippolyta von Petersdorff and Leopold von Schorlemmer. Her teachers included Eduard Behm, Henry or Magda von Dulong, Otto Lessman, and Luria (probably Arthur-Vincent Lourié). She married Paul von Loebell, and by 1914 was teaching voice at a music school in Berlin.

Schorlemmer was a member of the American Society of Composers, Authors, and Publishers (ASCAP). Her music was published by Otto Wrede and included:

Ballet  

works

Orchestra 

Intermezzo

Piano 

works

Vocal 

SCHWARZE DER BEN intermezzo (text by Hermann Frey/Martin Greif; music by Erny Chaloix) 

VERGESSEN valse boston (text by Hermann Frey/Martin Greif; music by Erny Chaloix)

References 

1875 births
1945 deaths
German women composers
Pseudonymous artists
ASCAP